A tubular bridge is a bridge built as a rigid box girder section within which the traffic is carried. Famous examples include the original Britannia Bridge over the Menai Strait, the Conwy railway bridge over the River Conwy, designed and tested by William Fairbairn and built by Robert Stephenson between 1846 and 1850, and the original Victoria Bridge in Montreal.

Conwy and Britannia Bridges

The Conwy railway bridge carries the North Wales coast railway line across the River Conwy between Llandudno Junction and the town of Conwy. The wrought iron tubular bridge was built by Robert Stephenson to a design by William Fairbairn, and is similar in construction to Stephenson's other famous tubular bridge, the Britannia Bridge across the Menai Strait. It was officially opened in 1849, but had been completed in 1848. Being the first tubular bridge to be built, the design needed much testing on prototypes to confirm that it would be capable of carrying heavy locomotives, the testing being performed by Fairbairn. The successful result enabled the much larger Britannia bridge to be built. The current Conwy bridge has been reinforced by extra columns under the bridge into the river, but is otherwise virtually unchanged since it was built.

Before the Britannia Bridge was constructed, Fairbairn conducted "the most celebrated of all engineering experiments on the grand scale" a series of experiments "of a gigantic character". One-sixth scale models, 78 ft long, were built at Fairbairn's Millwall Iron Works and tested with increasing loads. By this means, although at an experimental cost of thousands of pounds, the design of the cellular girder was refined until it could carry loads of 2.4 times the original capacity. The most significant finding was that of a thin section's susceptibility to buckling under compression loads, and the cellular girder's resistance to this. Stephenson's would build around a thousand other bridges using this cellular structure. The most impressive test was performed on-site at Conway. The 1300 ton tubular girder, deflecting 8 inches under its own weight, was loaded with a further 300 tons and the deflection measured. The effects of wind loading and asymmetric thermal expansion due to sunlight were also studied.

Chepstow and Tamar Bridges

At Chepstow, a tubular railway bridge was built to the instructions of Isambard Kingdom Brunel in 1852.  The "Great Tubular Bridge" over the River Wye, which at that point forms the boundary between Wales and England, is considered one of Brunel's major achievements, despite its appearance. It was economical in its use of materials, and would prove to be the design prototype for Brunel's Royal Albert Bridge at Saltash.

Other bridges
The unconventional nature of the tubular girder bridge was not widely accepted. John Fowler's 1847 tubular girder design for Torksey used tubes that were only 10 foot high and placed the railway deck between them, rather than inside. This is now considered as the first box girder bridge, rather than a pure tubular bridge. Despite this, it was initially rejected after completion by the Board of Trade’s inspector, Captain Lintorn Simmons, and the design was also criticized by the Institution of Civil Engineers. When the bridge was strengthened in 1897, this was done by added a central truss above the deck rather than by strengthening the box.

Legacy

Since the destruction by fire of Britannia Bridge in 1970, Conwy railway bridge remains the only surviving example of this means of construction undertaken by Stephenson.

See also
Box girder bridge - a similar bridge that carries the traffic outside the box.
Covered bridge - a type which may employ a variety of structures but which also encloses the traffic (for the protection of the bridge)
Jetway - a movable bridge that carries pedestrians from a terminal to an aircraft.
Skyway - a bridge connecting buildings at an elevation above the ground

References

Bibliography

John Rapley, The Britannia and Other Tubular Bridges: And the Men Who Built Them, Tempus (2003).

Bridges by structural type